Meehan is an unincorporated community located in the Town of Plover, Portage County, Wisconsin, United States.

Notable locals 
James Meehan (lumberman), lumberman and member of the Wisconsin State Assembly. It is unclear whether the settlement was named after the politician or not.

Notes

Unincorporated communities in Portage County, Wisconsin
Unincorporated communities in Wisconsin